The Bird and the Bee (stylized in all lowercase) is an American indie pop musical duo from Los Angeles, consisting of Inara George ("the bird") and Greg Kurstin ("the bee"). Kurstin is a seven-time Grammy Award–winning producer and multi-instrumentalist who has worked with artists including Sia, Adele, Beck, Kendrick Lamar, and the Foo Fighters. George and Kurstin met while the two were working on her debut album and they decided to collaborate on a jazz-influenced electropop project. Their debut EP, Again and Again and Again and Again, was released on October 31, 2006, followed by their self-titled debut album on January 23, 2007.

History

2006–07: Formation and The Bird and the Bee
According to their Myspace page, Greg and Inara were introduced in 2004 by mutual friend Mike Andrews, whom George had enlisted to produce her solo debut, All Rise. George and Kurstin soon found themselves spending hours together in the studio, where a shared interest in jazz-based music helped lay the foundation for the Bird and the Bee. [They] began to explore new sounds and textures, eventually composing enough material for their debut EP." That EP was the four-track Again and Again and Again and Again, released on October 31, 2006 by Blue Note Records. The EP includes the single "Fucking Boyfriend", which topped the Billboard Hot Dance Club Play chart on the issue dated December 2, 2006.

The duo's self-titled debut studio album, The Bird and the Bee was released on January 23, 2007 to positive reviews; AllMusic described it as "irresistible" and "charming and delightful at every turn".

Mid-2007 saw the band touring as the opening act for English singer Lily Allen, while their music was heard twice that year in the ABC drama series Grey's Anatomy, with "Again & Again" featured in the April 26 episode titled "Desire", and "Polite Dance Song" featured in the October 25 episode "Haunt You Every Day"; the former was also included on the third volume of the show's soundtrack. With the holiday season came additional exposure for the group, when Apple Inc.'s iTunes Store chose "Carol of the Bells" to be the featured "Free Single of the Week" for the week of November 27.

2008–10: Ray Guns Are Not Just the Future and Interpreting the Masters Volume 1
In 2008 the duo's third EP One Too Many Hearts was released exclusively in digital format on February 12, 2008 to coincide with Valentine's Day. The four-song collection featured a rendition of the 1920s standard "Tonight You Belong to Me".

The Bird and the Bee appeared repeatedly on TV and in films during 2008, with "Fucking Boyfriend" appearing in the film Forgetting Sarah Marshall and "How Deep Is Your Love" included in the film adaptation of Sex and the City and VH1 promos for their reality show lineup. On July 8 a performance recorded at Pearl Concert Theater in Las Vegas was released as a digital EP titled Live from Las Vegas at the Palms, including live versions of "Again & Again" (Bossa Nova Version), "Fucking Boyfriend", "Autumn Leaves", "Man", and "Preparedness".

In 2009 the Bird and the Bee marked the release of their second studio album, Ray Guns Are Not Just the Future, with two national television appearances: January 26 on NBC's The Tonight Show and February 4 on ABC's Jimmy Kimmel Live!. Following its January 27 release, the album debuted atop Billboards Top Heatseekers chart on sales of 5,000 copies. In support of the album, the duo embarked on a ten-date US tour, which kicked off at The Casbah in San Diego on February 5, 2009 and ended at Carnegie Hall in New York City on March 7. On March 14, The Bird and the Bee performed at the Tricot Showroom in Los Angeles as part of a FMLY show.

On March 23, 2010, the band released Interpreting the Masters Volume 1: A Tribute to Daryl Hall and John Oates, an album of Hall & Oates cover songs.

"What's in the Middle" was featured in the thirteenth episode of the fifth season of Bones. "4th of July" was featured in the Tim and Eric Awesome Show, Great Job! episode titled "Larry". Their song "Diamond Dave" appeared in Judd Apatow's 2009 film Funny People.

2011–present: Recreational Love

The Bird and the Bee announced on their official Facebook page on September 26, 2011 that they were no longer signed to Blue Note Records. They also stated, "We don't have an exact release date for the album yet, but it'll most likely be early 2012." On November 18, 2011, the duo released a digital-only Christmas single titled "Wishes" through their website.

The Bird and the Bee contributed "All Our Endless Love" to the soundtrack for the 2014 film Endless Love. This was a collaboration with Matt Berninger, and was released on the soundtrack album on 11 February 2014. They produced a new track named "Undone" for the soundtrack of Sex Tape in July of the same year.

In April 2015, George announced that a new album would be released in July of that same year. The album, released on 17 July, was titled Recreational Love. The album's debut single, "Will You Dance?" was released on 5 May 2015.

In September 2017, both George and Kurstin were featured on the Foo Fighters song "Dirty Water", from the Kurstin-produced album Concrete and Gold. George contributed the background vocals to the track, while Kurstin played the synth.

In August 2019, "Interpreting The Masters Volume 2: A Tribute to Van Halen" was released.

On 23 October 2020 they released a christmas album Put Up The Lights through No Expectations/Release Me Records. It features Dave Grohl on drums on the track "Little Drummer Boy".

Discography

Studio albums

Extended plays

Singles

Other charted songs

Other appearances

References

External links
 

American pop music duos
American synth-pop groups
Blue Note Records artists
Electronic music duos
Electronic music groups from California
Indie pop groups from Los Angeles
Musical groups established in 2006
Male–female musical duos